Thymidylate synthase (TS) is an enzyme that catalyzes the conversion of deoxyuridine monophosphate (dUMP) to deoxythymidine monophosphate (dTMP).  Thymidine is one of the nucleotides in DNA. With inhibition of TS, an imbalance of deoxynucleotides and increased levels of dUMP arise. Both cause DNA damage.

Function 

The following reaction is catalyzed by thymidylate synthase:

 5,10-methylenetetrahydrofolate + dUMP  dihydrofolate + dTMP

By means of reductive methylation, deoxyuridine monophosphate (dUMP) and N5,N10-methylene tetrahydrofolate are together used to form dTMP, yielding dihydrofolate as a secondary product.

This provides the sole de novo pathway for production of dTMP and is the only enzyme in folate metabolism in which the 5,10-methylenetetrahydrofolate is oxidised during one-carbon transfer. The enzyme is essential for regulating the balanced supply of the 4 DNA precursors in normal DNA replication: defects in the enzyme activity affecting the regulation process cause various biological and genetic abnormalities, such as thymineless death. The enzyme is an important target for certain chemotherapeutic drugs. Thymidylate synthase is an enzyme of about 30 to 35 kDa in most species except in protozoan and plants where it exists as a bifunctional enzyme that includes a dihydrofolate reductase domain. A cysteine residue is involved in the catalytic mechanism (it covalently binds the 5,6-dihydro-dUMP intermediate). The sequence around the active site of this enzyme is conserved from phages to vertebrates.

Thymidylate synthase is induced by a transcription factor LSF/TFCP2 and LSF is an oncogene in hepatocellular carcinoma. LSF and Thymidylate synthase plays significant role in Liver Cancer proliferation and progression and Drug resistance.

Clinical significance 

Thymidylate synthase (TS) plays a crucial role in the early stages of DNA biosynthesis. DNA damage or deletion occur on a daily basis as a result of both endogenous and environmental factors. Such environmental factors include ultraviolet damage and cigarette smoke that contain a variety of carcinogens. Therefore, synthesis and insertion of healthy DNA is vital for normal body functions and avoidance of cancerous activity. In addition, inhibition in synthesis of important nucleotides necessary for cell growth is important. For this reason, TS has become an important target for cancer treatment by means of chemotherapy. The sensitivity of TS to succumb to TS inhibitors is a key part to its success as treatment for colorectal, pancreatic, ovarian, gastric, and breast cancers.

Using TS as a drug target 

The use of TS inhibitors has become a main focus of using TS as a drug target.  The most widely used inhibitor is 5-fluorouracil (5-FU), which acts as an antimetabolite that irreversibly inhibits TS by competitive binding. However, due to a low level of 5-FU found in many patients, it has been discovered that in combination with leucovorin (LV), 5-FU has greater success in down regulating tumor progression mechanisms and increasing immune system activity.

Experimentally, it has been shown that low levels of TS expression leads to a better response to 5-FU and higher success rates and survival of colon and liver cancer patients. However, additional experiments have merely stated that levels of TS may be associated with stage of disease, cell proliferation and tumor differentiation for those with lung adenocarcinoma but low levels are not necessarily indicators of high success. Expression levels of TS mRNA may be helpful in predicting the malignant potential of certain cancerous cells, thus improving cancer treatment targets and yielding higher survival rates among cancer patients [Hashimoto].

TS's relation to the cell cycle also contributes to its use in cancer treatment. Several cell-cycle dependent kinases and transcription factors influence TS levels in the cell cycle that increase its activity during the S phase but decrease its activity while cells are no longer proliferating. In an auto-regulatory manner, TS not only controls its own translation but that of other proteins such as p53 that through mutation is the root of much tumor growth. Through its translation, TS has a varying expression in cancer cells and tumors, which leads to early cell death.

Interactive pathway map

Mechanism description 

In the proposed mechanism, TS forms a covalent bond to the substrate dUMP through a 1,4-addition involving a cysteine nucleophile. The substrate tetrahydrofolate donates a methyl group to the alpha carbon while reducing the new methyl on dUMP to form dTMP.
 

It has been proven that the imine formed through reaction with THF and dUMP is an intermediate in the reaction with dUMP through mutations in the structure of TS that inhibit the completion of the mechanism. V316Am TS, a mutant with deletion of C terminal valines from both subunits, allows the catalysis of dehalogenation of BrdUMP preceding the mechanism described above and the covalent bond to THF and dUMP. The mutant TS is unable to accomplish the C-terminal conformational change needed to break covalent bonds to form dTMP, thus showing the proposed mechanism to be true. The structure was deduced through x-ray crystallography of V316Am TS to illustrate full homodimer TS structure (Figure 1). In addition, it showed possible interactions of the 175Arg and 174Arg between dimers. These arginines are thought to stabilize the UMP structures within the active sites by creating hydrogen bonds to the phosphate group (Figure 2). [Stroud and Finer-Moore]
5-FU is an inhibitor of TS. Upon entering the cell, 5-fluorouracil (5-FU) is converted to a variety of active metabolites, intracellularly. One such metabolite is FdUMP which differs from dUMP by a fluorine in place of a hydrogen on the alpha carbon. FdUMP is able to inhibit TS by binding to the nucleotide-binding site of dUMP. This competitive binding inhibits the normal function of dTMP synthesis from dUMP [Longley]. Thus the dUMP is unable to have an elimination reaction and complete the methyl donation from THF.

Figure 1. This figure depicts the homodimer that is TS. As you can see the orange and teal backbones never connect or intertwine, but there are side chains interactions between the dimers. On the orange protein, you can visibly detect two long side chains that enter the teal protein (this is located within the yellow circle). The other beige parts are side chains that interact within the active site. Just below the yellow circle, you are able to see the same pattern of side chains and configuration.

 
Figure 2. This figure shows the possible H-bond interactions between the arginines and the UMP in the active site of thymidylate synthase. This can be seen by the faint lines between the blue tips and the red tips. These arginines are used to hold the position of the UMP molecule so that the interaction may occur correctly. The two arginines in the top right corner that are located next to each other on the back bone are actually from the other protein of this dimer enzyme. This interaction is one of the many intermolecular forces that holds these two tertiary structures together. The yellow stand in the top-middle region shows a sulfur bond that forms between a cysteine side chain and UMP. This covalently holds the UMP within the active site until it is reacted to yield TMP.

See also
 Pyrimidine analogues
 Thymidylate synthase inhibitor
 Thymidine kinase
 Thymidine kinase in clinical chemistry
 Thymidylate kinase

References

Further reading

External links
 
 PDBe-KB provides an overview of all the structure information available in the PDB for Human Thymidylate synthase

EC 2.1.1